Sir John Hare (1603–1637), of Stow Bardolph, Norfolk, was an English politician.

He was a Member (MP) of the Parliament of England for Aylesbury in 1625, for Evesham in 1626 and for King's Lynn in 1628.

References

1603 births
1637 deaths
People from Stow Bardolph
English MPs 1625
English MPs 1626
English MPs 1628–1629